Aatto Pietikäinen (October 7, 1921, Kuopio – April 2, 1966) was a Finnish ski jumper who competed in the 1940s.  He finished eighth in the individual large hill event at the 1948 Winter Olympics in St. Moritz.

External links 
 Individual large hill Winter Olympic results: 1924–56
 Aatto Pietikäinen's profile at Sports Reference.com

1921 births
1966 deaths
People from Kuopio
Finnish male ski jumpers
Ski jumpers at the 1948 Winter Olympics
Sportspeople from North Savo
20th-century Finnish people